Institute of Management (and) Technology may refer to:

Germany
 Stuttgart Institute of Management and Technology, Stuttgart, Germany

India
 Institute of Management Technology, Ghaziabad, a business school in India
 Institute of Management Technology, Nagpur, a business school in India
 Institute of Management Technology, Hyderabad, a business school in India
 Interscience Institute of Management & Technology, Bhubaneswar
 Regional Institute of Management and Technology, Mandi Gobindgarh, Punjab
 Indian Institute of Information Technology and Management, Gwalior
 Sagar Institute of Technology and Management, Uttar Pradesh, India
 Accurate Institute of Management and Technology, Greater Noida
 Institute of Technology and Management, Gwalior
 Gandhi Institute of Technology and Management, a private university in Andhra Pradesh
 Maharashtra Udayagiri Institute of Management & Technology Somnathpur, an engineering college based in Udgir
 Girijananda Chowdhury Institute of Management and Technology, Guwahati, Assam
 Shri Atmanand Jain Institute of Management and Technology (AIMT), affiliated with Kurukshetra University
 Punjab Institute of Management and Technology (PIMT), Mandi Gobindgarh
 Girijananda Chowdhury Institute of Management and Technology, Tezpur, Assam

Pakistan
 University of Management and Technology (Lahore), formerly known as the Institute of Management and Technology

Sri Lanka
 South Asian Institute of Technology and Management, a privately owned educational institution

Ukraine
 Institute of Management Technologies, an institute of the National Aviation University, Ukraine